The  is a monorail electric multiple unit (EMU) train type operated by the Tokyo Monorail on the Tokyo Monorail Haneda Airport Line in Japan since 1997.

Overview
The 2000 series trains were introduced from 1997 to replace the ageing 700 series and 800 series trains dating from 1982 and to provide increased capacity with the opening of Terminal 2 at Haneda Airport. These trains were the first monorail trains in Japan to use VVVF control.

Formation
The fleet consists of four six-car sets (numbered 2011 to 2041) as shown below, with four motored ("M") cars and two non-powered trailer ("T") cars. Car 1 is at the  end.

 "x" stands for the set number.

Interior
Passenger accommodation consists of a mixture of facing four-seat bays and longitudinal bench seats. Cars 1 and 6 have wheelchair spaces.

History
The fleet of four trainsets was delivered between 1997 and 2002 in three batches: batch 24 (set 2011), batch 25 (sets 2021 and 2031), and batch 26 (set 2041). The first set, set 2011, was delivered on 31 July 1997, with the last set, set 2041, delivered by 23 April 2002.

Awards
The 2000 series trains received the Japanese Good Design Award in 1997.

References

Electric multiple units of Japan
2000 series
Train-related introductions in 1997
750 V DC multiple units
Hitachi multiple units